Sadaf Sabzwari,  Kanwal, is a Pakistani actress and model. She has played the role of Sharmeen Mukhtiyar in 2017 movie Balu Mahi. As a model, Kanwal has established a career and has been nominated for several awards including Lux Style Awards and Hum Awards. She later portrayed a supporting role in the period drama Alif (2019).

Personal life 
Kanwal is the granddaughter of Pakistani senior actress Salma Mumtaz and the niece of Nida Mumtaz. On 31 May 2020, Kanwal married Shehroz Sabzwari.  Sadaf Kanwal welcome her first baby girl on 09th August 2022 and with husband Shehroz Sabzwari he already has a daughter called Nooreh with actress Syra Yosuf.

Filmography

Awards and nominations

References

External links
 
 

Pakistani film actresses
Living people
Pakistani female models
1993 births